Nagarjuna Vidyaniketan is a high school in Bangalore, India. The school is affiliated to the Central Board of Secondary Education (CBSE). It is located in Yelahanka, Ramagondanahalli.

Establishment
Nagarjuna Education Society was established in the year 1995 by Sri J V Ranga Raju, who is an industrialist and a philanthropist.

Customs
During the last week of June every year, an investiture ceremony is held where the School Head Boy and School Head Girl, the Sports Captain and Vice Captain, the house captains and vice captains and the presidents and secretaries of the associations in the school, are nominated. Towards the end of the academic year, the Flag Handing Over Ceremony is held wherein the prefect and the captains hand over charge to their deputies for the rest of the academic year. The house cup is given to the winning house during the ceremony.

Assessment and evaluation
As directed by the CBSE board, New Delhi Classes VI – X will have two Formative Assessments and one Summative Assessment during both the terms of an academic session. Necessary amendments will be introduced in line with the instructions from the Board. Classes I – V will have continuous assessments on a regular basis.

Along with scholastic skills, co – scholastic skills also will be tested during both the terms. Special focus is laid on Life Skills, Attitude and Values, participation and achievements in competitions as well as literary Activities, creative and scientific skills. Aesthetic skills and performing arts are also assessed. Due importance is given to clubs, Health and Physical Education programmes.

References

Private schools in Bangalore